Siobhan McColl (born 2 April 1991 in Gauteng, South Africa) is a South African figure skater. She is the 2006–2007 and 2007–2008 season South African junior national champion and has competed on the Junior Grand Prix circuit and at the World Junior Figure Skating Championships.

Competitive highlights

 N = Novice level; J = Junior level

External links
 

South African female single skaters
1991 births
Living people
Sportspeople from Gauteng
South African people of Irish descent
South African people of Scottish descent